The Caller is a 1987 mystery thriller film starring Malcolm McDowell and Madolyn Smith, distributed independently by Empire Pictures.

The special effects were done by FX engineer John Carl Beuchler, known for his long list of film credits including Friday the 13th Part VII: The New Blood, A Nightmare on Elm Street 4: The Dream Master, and Re-Animator.

Plot
A mysterious man joins a woman in her forest cabin. He initially claims that his car had broken down and he needs her assistance. Soon things become suspect. The two examine each other's stories for inconsistencies. The woman claims she caused the accident to lure the man up so she can kill him. The man claims he is a police officer, investigating the possibility the woman has killed her own family.

Neither claim stands up well to scrutiny. The movie then ends with a genre-bending twist.

Release
Originally intended for a theatrical release, the film was only shown at the 1987 Cannes Film Market and the 1987 MystiFest in Italy. On December 27, 1989, the film was finally released in the United States on videocassette by Trans World Entertainment. MGM released a manufactured-on-demand DVD-R of the film on March 15, 2011.

In July 2020, Vinegar Syndrome announced that they were set to release a new scan of the original film print, on Blu-ray for the first time.

References

External links

1987 films
1987 thriller films
American mystery thriller films
Empire International Pictures films
1980s mystery thriller films
Films based on urban legends
Films directed by Arthur Allan Seidelman
Films scored by Richard Band
1980s English-language films
1980s American films